Vatoli is a village in Telangana state of India. It was in news when it witnessed communal riots and tension in 2008 when all members of a Muslim family were burned by miscreants. Vatoli was then part of Adilabad district of undivided Andhra Pradesh.

The Vatoli incident evoked strong condemnation from all political parties including the Telugu Desam, Telangana Rashtra Samithi, Congress and the BJP. The then Andhra Pradesh government ordered a magisterial inquiry into the incident of burning alive of a family but no subsequent corrective development took place later.

Adilabad District Sessions Court judge Aruna Sarika quashed the case against the nine accused arrested in this connection, all members of Hindu Vahini due to lack of proper technical and scientific evidence produced by the Indian investigation agency CB CID.

References

2008 in India
Crime in Andhra Pradesh